Assimina A. (Mina) Pelegri  (born 1968) is a Greek-American materials scientist whose research involves the use of the finite element method to model and study composite materials and biological connective tissue. She is a professor at Rutgers University, where she chairs the Department of Mechanical & Aerospace Engineering.

Education and career
Pelegri was born in 1968. After earning a diploma in metallurgy at the National Technical University of Athens in 1992, Pelegri went to Georgia Tech for graduate study, supported by a Fulbright Fellowship. She earned a master's degree in aerospace engineering there in 1994, and completed a Ph.D. in 1997, also completing a degree in the management of technology at the same time through Georgia Tech's Scheller College of Business.

She has been on the Rutgers University faculty since 1996, and from 2010 to 2013 held the M. W. Railser Distinguished Teaching Chair there.

Recognition
Pelegri was named an ASME Fellow in 2014.

References

External links

1968 births
Living people
Materials scientists and engineers
Women materials scientists and engineers
Greek engineers
Greek women engineers
American engineers
American women engineers
National Technical University of Athens alumni
Fulbright alumni
Georgia Tech alumni
Rutgers University faculty
Fellows of the American Society of Mechanical Engineers